Agyneta leucophora is a species of sheet weaver found in the United States. It was described by Chamberlin & Ivie in 1944.

References

leucophora
Spiders of the United States
Spiders described in 1944
Taxa named by Wilton Ivie